VNP may refer to:

 Valiant's NP, an arithmetic circuit complexity class
 Ventricular Natriuretic Peptide, an alternative name for Brain natriuretic peptide
 Voters Not Politicians, a political movement in Michigan
 Voyageurs National Park, northern Minnesota, USA
 Vulcan nerve pinch, a fictional manoeuvre
 Video Network Platform
 Virtual Network Protocol
 Beijing South railway station, China Railway telegraph code VNP